Eriş Özkan  (born 1 September 1981 in Bursa) is a Turkish professional footballer who plays as a defender for İnegölspor in the TFF Third League.

He formerly played for Kütahyaspor, Erzincanspor, Eskişehirspor, Kardemir D.Ç. Karabükspor, Şanlıurfa Belediyespor, Afyonkarahisarspor and Göztepe. He appeared in five TFF First League matches with Eskişehirspor during 2006.

References

External links

1981 births
Living people
Turkish footballers
Eskişehirspor footballers
Kardemir Karabükspor footballers
Göztepe S.K. footballers
Erzincanspor footballers
Afyonkarahisarspor footballers
Association football defenders